Odell Lake is located near Willamette Pass in the northwest corner of Klamath County, Oregon, United States.  It is one of several lakes in the Cascade Range in Central Oregon, and lies within the Deschutes National Forest. It was named for Oregon Surveyor General William Holman Odell by Byron J. Pengra, in July 1865, while they were making a preliminary survey for the Oregon Central Military Road, which would later become Oregon Route 58. The lake fills a basin carved by a glacier, and the resulting terminal moraine confines the water along the lake's southeast shore.

Community
The place was also known as Odell Lake Resort, and today is the site of Odell Lake Lodge. The historic lodge building was constructed in 1903. In the 1930s on the west end of the lake another resort, Shelter Cove Resort which includes cabins, camping sites, RV parking, and docks for boating.

Recreation
There are several developed campgrounds around Odell Lake, as well as boat ramps that allow for sailing, wind surfing, water skiing and fishing. The last two state record lake trout (mackinaw) were caught in Odell Lake; the most recent being a  lake trout caught in 1984. Fish species found in the lake include:
Rainbow trout
Kokanee salmon
Mountain whitefish
Lake trout (mackinaw) - non-native introduced species
Bull trout - listed as a threatened species

See also 
 List of lakes in Oregon

References

External links

US Forest Service site for Deschutes National Forest
Historic image of Odell Lake Lodge from the University of Oregon digital archives
Odell Lake Lodge Website

Lakes of Oregon
Lakes of Klamath County, Oregon
Deschutes National Forest
Protected areas of Klamath County, Oregon